IEEE Wireless Communications is a bimonthly scientific journal published by the IEEE Communications Society. Papers highlight such topics as portable telephones, communicating palmtop computers, protocols, messaging, communications, and personalized traffic filtering. It also covers such policy issues as spectrum allocation, industry structure, and technology evolution.

The current editor is Yi Qian of University of Nebraska-Lincoln, USA. It is abstracted and indexed in most of the major bibliographic databases. According to the Journal Citation Reports, the journal has a 2020 impact factor of 11.979.

References

External links
 IEEE Communications Society's Digital Library
 

Engineering journals
Wireless Communications